The Pakokku U Ohn Pe literary award is a literary award for Burmese writers that was established in 1992 by the businessman Pakokku U Ohn Pe, who initially provided K7.6 million to be used for prizes. 
The awards complement the government's National Literary Awards and Sarpay Beikman Manuscript Awards and the Sayawun Tin Shwe Award, Thuta Swesone literary award and Tun Foundation award.

Awards by year

2006 awards
The winners of the 2006 awards were announced on 26 February 2007.  They were:

2008 awards
The awards for 2008 were presented in Yangon on 30 March 2009. 
The ceremony was attended by Minister for Information Brigadier-General Kyaw Hsan.
Prizes were:

References

Burmese literary awards
Awards established in 1992
1992 in Myanmar